American Airlines flies to 269 domestic destinations and 92 international destinations in 48 countries. The list includes the city, country, and the airport's name, with the airline's hubs, seasonal destinations, and previously served destinations marked where applicable. This list does not include airports served by only American Eagle, the airline's regional hub transport brand.

See also

 List of American Eagle Airlines destinations

References

Lists of airline destinations
Oneworld destinations
American Airlines